Ondskan may refer to:

 Ondskan (novel), the book by Jan Guillou
 Evil (2003 film), Ondskan, the movie based on the book